Dinning is the surname of the following people:
Dean Dinning (b. 1967), American musician and music producer
Jim Dinning (born 1952), Canadian politician and businessman
Mark Dinning (1933–1986), American pop music singer
Tony Dinning (born 1975), English football midfielder
American singing trio The Dinning Sisters: Ella (1920–2000), Virginia (1924–2013) and Jean Dinning (1924–2011) 

English-language surnames